General George Morrison (1703 – 26 November 1799) was Quartermaster-General to the Forces.

Military career
Morrison joined the British Army as a gunner in 1722. He was involved in suppressing the Jacobite rising of 1745 and as a result was sent to Royal Military Academy, Woolwich as an Officer Cadet.

Morrison led the construction of a series of roads in Scotland on the orders of Field Marshal George Wade. In 1757 he was commissioned as a Captain-Lieutenant and in 1758 he served in the Seven Years' War in which he led the destruction of a number of forts in France.

In 1763 he was appointed Quartermaster-General to the Forces, although this was not gazetted until 1773, From 1779 to 1782 he was Colonel of the short-lived 75th Regiment of Foot (Prince of Wales's Regiment). In 1782 he was made Colonel of the 17th (Leicestershire) Regiment of Foot and in 1792 was made Colonel of the King's Own Royal Regiment (Lancaster), a command he held until his death.

In 1796 he was promoted to full General.

Family
He married Mary and together they had six children.

References

 

|-

|-

|-

|-

1703 births
1799 deaths
British Army generals
Royal Leicestershire Regiment officers